Pratica(mente) is a 2006 studio album by prominent Portuguese rapper and producer Sam the Kid. It is his first studio album, all of his previous works being recorded in his home.

The album features many prominent Portuguese artists, such as Melo D, Cool Hipnoise, Lil John from Buraka Som Sistema, Kalaf, valete, Cruzfader, NBC, G.Q. and Carlos Bica.

The album's single is called "Poetas de Karaoke".

Track listing

References 

2006 albums
Sam the Kid albums